Burro Pass, elevation , is a mountain pass in Yosemite National Park, United States.

A United States Geological Survey topographer named the gap after his burro.

References

Landforms of Tuolumne County, California
Mountain passes of California